Jackson Heights is an unincorporated community in Warren Township, Jefferson County, Ohio, United States.

References 

Unincorporated communities in Jefferson County, Ohio